Pavel Chistopolov, (born 15 March 1984), is a Russian futsal player who plays for Gazprom UGRA and the Russian national futsal team.

References

External links
 
 
 AMFR profile

1984 births
Living people
Russian men's futsal players
Sportspeople from Sverdlovsk Oblast